Vlkas is a village and municipality in the Nové Zámky District in the Nitra Region of south-west Slovakia.

History
In historical records the village was first mentioned in 1231.

Geography
The municipality lies at an altitude of 136 metres and covers an area of 6.698 km². It has a population of about 310 people.

Ethnicity
The population is about 97% Slovak and 3% Hungarian people.

Facilities
The village has a small public library a gym and football pitch.

References

External links
 
 
 http://www.statistics.sk/mosmis/eng/run.html
 Vlkas - Nové Zámky Okolie

Villages and municipalities in Nové Zámky District